A pension is a type of guest house or boarding house. This term is typically used in Continental European countries, in areas of North Africa and the Middle East that formerly had large European expatriate populations, and in some parts of South America such as Brazil and Paraguay. Pensions can also be found in South Korea, Japan, and the Philippines.

In contrast to bed and breakfasts, more usual in the United States, pensions typically offer not only breakfast, but also lunch, dinner, and sometimes even tea. Rather than paying for the room and each meal separately, guests select a plan which either comprises overnight accommodation, breakfast, lunch and dinner (full pension / full board) or the preceding minus the lunch (half board / demi-pension / half pension).

These small businesses may offer special rates for travellers staying longer than a week, may be located in historic buildings, can be family-run, and are generally cheaper than other lodgings, such as hotels, although they offer more limited services.

In popular culture
Literature
 Naguib Mahfouz's 1967 novel Miramar focuses on the lives of the long-term residents of the eponymous pension in Alexandria in the 1960s. 
 E. M. Forster's 1908 novel A Room with a View opens with the protagonist Lucy Honeychurch and her spinster cousin and chaperone Charlotte Bartlett complaining about the Pensione Bertolini, where they are staying in Florence, Italy. The first act of the book is based in Florence with many scenes taking place in the pension, as Lucy meets characters for the first time who feature throughout the book, most importantly a slightly eccentric young Englishman named George Emerson, and his father.
 The Pension Grillparzer is presented as a work of fiction within the 1978 novel The World According to Garp by John Irving. It involves the lives of a hotel critic and his family intertwining with those of a Hungarian circus troupe.

Films
 In Summertime, an American/British romantic film, Katharine Hepburn stars as Jane Hudson, a single, middle-aged elementary school secretary, who goes on her summer vacation to Venice, Italy. Arriving by water taxi, she stays at the Pensione Fiorini, owned by the Signora Fiorini (Isa Miranda), a widow who transformed her home into a pension after World War II.
 In Only You, Marisa Tomei as Faith Corvatch and Bonnie Hunt as Kate Corvatch are directed to a pension by Joaquim de Almeida as Giovanni, where they stay while in Rome.

References

Hotel types